Xolani is a South African  Xhosa, Zulu male given name.

Notable people with this name include:
 Xolani Dlwati, South African priest
 Xolani Mahlaba, South African cricketer
 Xolani Mdaki, South African footballer
 Xolani Mlambo, South African footballer
 Xolani Sotashe, South African politician